The 2001 Teen Choice Awards ceremony was held on August 12, 2001, at the Universal Amphitheatre, Universal City, California. The event had no designated host but David Spade introduced the show with Aaron Carter and Nick Carter, Usher, Eve and Gwen Stefani and Shaggy as performers. Sarah Michelle Gellar received the Extraordinary Achievement Award.

Performers
Moulin Huge
Aaron Carter & Nick Carter – "Not Too Young, Not Too Old"
Usher – "U Remind Me"
Eve feat. Gwen Stefani – "Let Me Blow Ya Mind"
Shaggy – "Angel"

Presenters

3LW
Pamela Anderson
Lynsey Bartilson
David Boreanaz
Nick Cannon
Carrot Top
Erika Christensen
City High
Mo Collins
Destiny's Child
Dream
Eden's Crush
Anne Hathaway
Tony Hawk
Jennifer Love Hewitt
Chris Kattan
Mila Kunis
Ashton Kutcher
Mandy Lauderdale
Lil' Bow Wow
Lisa "Left Eye" Lopes
Christina Milian
Mandy Moore
Frankie Muniz
Mýa
NSYNC
Jared Padalecki
Freddie Prinze Jr.
Keri Russell
Jessica Simpson
Sisqó
David Spade
Britney Spears
Nicole Sullivan
Sean Patrick Thomas
Michelle Trachtenberg
Tyrese
Kerry Washington

Winners and nominees
Winners are listed first and highlighted in bold text.

Movies

Television

Music

Miscellaneous

References

2001
2001 awards
2001 in American music
2001 in California
2000s in Los Angeles